Fyodor Anatolyevich Shcherbachenko (born 13 August 1962) is a Russian professional football coach and a former player and referee. He is the sporting director of FC Rotor Volgograd.

Career

Playing
As a player, he made his debut in the Soviet Second League in 1981 for FC Tsement Novorossiysk.

Referee
From 1995 to 1998, he worked as a referee, mostly in the Russian Second Division and lower levels.

Managerial
Following Dmitriy Ogai resignation in July 2015, Shcherbachenko was appointed as manager of FC Kaisar on 6 August 2015. Shcherbachenko left the club on 10 November following the completion of the 2015 season during which Kaisar were relegated.

Honours
 Russian Second Division, Zone Ural-Povolzhye best manager: 2009.
 Football Championship of the National League winner: 2011/12

References

1962 births
People from Slavyansk-na-Kubani
Living people
Soviet footballers
Association football forwards
FC Kuban Krasnodar players
FC Chernomorets Novorossiysk players
Russian football referees
Russian football managers
FC Kuban Krasnodar managers
FC Baltika Kaliningrad managers
FC Mordovia Saransk managers
FC Rotor Volgograd managers
Ulisses FC managers
FC Kaisar Kyzylorda managers
FC Minsk managers
Russian Premier League managers
Russian expatriate football managers
Expatriate football managers in Armenia
Expatriate football managers in Kazakhstan
Expatriate football managers in Belarus